Praestilbia is a genus of moths of the family Noctuidae.

Species
 Praestilbia armeniaca Staudinger, 1892

References
Natural History Museum Lepidoptera genus database
Praestilbia at funet

Hadeninae